It was a Dacian fortified town. The Dacian name is Susudava.

Dacian fortresses
Romanian exonyms